Christa von Szabó was an Austrian figure skater who competed in pair skating.

With partner Leo Horwitz, she won bronze medals at two World Figure Skating Championships: in 1913 and 1914.

Competitive highlights 
With Leo Horwitz

References 

Austrian female pair skaters
Date of birth missing
Date of death missing